The San Francisco Italian Athletic Club is a men's social and athletic club located at 1630 Stockton Street on Washington Square, North Beach in San Francisco, California.  It sponsors the Statuto Race, an annual footrace event that has been running since 1919.

History 
The current club was the result of the merger of several smaller Italian sports clubs in San Francisco. The first club formed in 1917 and was called Circolo Ricreativo Italiano Virtus. In 1919 a second club emerged called Unione Sportiva Italiana. Shortly thereafter Sporting Club Italia began in 1920. The following year SC Italia joined with Virtus becoming Italia Virtus Club. In 1926 they merged with Unione to become the largest Italian sports club in the country as Unione Sportiva Italiana Virtus. By 1936 the current building of the club had been completed at which point they became known as Italian Athletic Club. Negative sentiment during the World War II period led to the club dropping 'Italian' from their name and continued as simply San Francisco Athletic Club until 1979 when 'Italian' was once again part of their name.

Statuto Race
This is an annual footrace, started in 1919 by the Unione Sportiva Italiana predecessor of the continuing club. It celebrates the creation of Italy's first constitution, the Statuto Albertino. It is one of a number in the Bay Area such as the Dipsea (started in 1905) and Bay to Breakers (started in 1912 as the "Cross City Race").  The Statuto and these others are among the oldest footraces in the United States.  A National Park Service document stated, about the Statuto: "The annual footrace across city streets energized the North Beach community, largely composed of Italian immigrants looking for a better life in America. The club’s activism in community improvement included not only the footrace and other sports but also culture and community service."  It had its 101st running on June 5, 2022, with an 8K footrace won in 24 minutes and 54 seconds.  There was also a 2M walk event.

Athletics 
The club has participated in numerous sporting activities including baseball, basketball cycling, fencing, gymnastics, running, and soccer. Their Statuto Race is among the oldest annual foot races in the country having started back in 1919 to commemorate Italy's first constitution as a cohesive nation. One of the club's highest achievements was accomplished by their soccer team when they won the 1976 National Challenge Cup Steve Negoesco, of USF fame, was the coach of the champion soccer team. Other notable people from the SFIAC club are Ray Piva (runner), Steve Landi (power lifter), Gino Cimoli (baseball), and Steve Mariucci (football).

In 2016, SFIAC's Men's Soccer Team was promoted to the SFSFL Premier Division, which returns the team to the top local semi-professional level within the San Francisco Bay Area. SFIAC's soccer team still competes in the SFSFL Premier Division to this day.

References

Sources 
Pierucci, Gianrico Claudio.  The Heart of North Beach. SFIAC Press, 2008,

External links 
Official website

Athletics clubs in the United States
Italian-American culture in San Francisco
New
Sports organizations based in San Francisco
Gentlemen's clubs in California
Italian
North Beach, San Francisco
Diaspora soccer clubs in the United States
Italian sports clubs outside Italy
U.S. Open Cup winners